Philip Brown (born ) is the 46th and current mayor of Charlottetown, Prince Edward Island, Canada. He was elected in the general municipal election held on November 5, 2018, and took office on December 6.

Brown served two terms on Charlottetown City Council from 2001 to 2006. He ran for mayor unsuccessfully in 2010 and 2014.

References 

Living people
Mayors of Charlottetown
Year of birth missing (living people)